Anapisa preussi is a moth of the family Erebidae. It was described by Max Gaede in 1926. It is found in Sierra Leone.

References

Moths described in 1926
Syntomini
Erebid moths of Africa